is a 1999 Japanese kaiju film directed by Takao Okawara, written by Hiroshi Kashiwabara and Wataru Mimura, produced by Shogo Tomiyama and starring  Takehiro Murata, Hiroshi Abe, Naomi Nishida, Mayu Suzuki and Shiro Sano. Produced and distributed by Toho Studios, it is the 24th film in the Godzilla franchise, as well as the first film in the franchise's Millennium period. The film was also the 23rd Godzilla film to be produced by Toho, and was Toho's second reboot of the Godzilla franchise after the 1984 film The Return of Godzilla. The film, along with the subsequent Godzilla films in the franchise's Millennium era, ignores continuity established by any previous films with the sole exception of the original 1954 film.

Godzilla 2000 was released in Japan on December 11, 1999 and in North America on August 18, 2000, by TriStar Pictures. It received mixed reviews from critics and performed below TriStar's expectations, grossing just over $10 million at the North American box office. It was the last film in the franchise to receive a North American theatrical release until Shin Godzilla in 2016. In Japan, the film was followed by Godzilla vs. Megaguirus, which was released on December 16, 2000.

Plot
Godzilla is a literal force of nature to Japan. The Godzilla Prediction Network (GPN) functions independently to study the monster and predict its landfalls. Meanwhile, the scientists of Crisis Control Intelligence (CCI) find a sixty-million-year-old unidentified flying object (UFO) deep in the Japan Trench. As CCI attempts to raise the UFO to study it, it takes off into the sky on its own. Godzilla arrives in a village and then battles the Japan Self Defense Forces, now equipped with powerful Full Metal Missiles, but the UFO appears, searching for genetic information that only Godzilla possesses. It fights Godzilla, driving the monster underwater, and then lands to replenish its solar power.

Yuji Shinoda, the founder of the GPN, discovers the secret to Godzilla's regenerative properties (named Organizer G1 in the Japanese version, but Regenerator G1 in the North American release), but so has the UFO. It frees itself from the JSDF's attempts to contain it, and heads for Shinjuku. After landing atop Tokyo Opera City Tower, it begins to drain all the files about Godzilla from Tokyo's master computers. As it begins to alter the oxygen content of the surrounding atmosphere, CCI attempts to destroy the UFO using explosive charges, but Shinoda, attempting to find out more about the aliens, is nearly caught in the blast. He survives, and joins his peers on a nearby rooftop, watching the UFO. Almost in response, the UFO broadcasts its message of invasion and creating a new empire on Earth, and Shinoda reveals that the aliens are after the regenerative properties contained inside Godzilla's DNA so that they may use it to re-form their bodies.

Godzilla arrives and again battles the UFO. However, Godzilla is subdued by the UFO's assault, and the UFO absorbs some of Godzilla's DNA, which the aliens use to reform themselves outside the space ship as the gigantic Millennian. However, the Millennian is unable to control Godzilla's genetic information in the DNA and mutates into a horrible monster named Orga. Godzilla recovers and brings down the UFO before fighting Orga, but Orga, having absorbed the regenerative properties of Godzilla's DNA, is highly resistant to injury. Orga retaliates and extracts more of Godzilla's DNA in order to become a perfect clone. Godzilla breaks free and sets Orga ablaze with its atomic breath attack, but Orga re-emerges and attempts to swallow Godzilla whole. As Orga begins to transform, Godzilla charges a nuclear pulse and unleashes it, vaporizing Orga's entire upper body and killing it. Mitsuo Katagiri, head of CCI, dies when Godzilla partially destroys the roof of the building where he, Shinoda and the authorities were observing the battle. Those remaining on the roof reminisce on how Godzilla was wrought by human ambition, prompting Shinoda to suggest that "Godzilla exists in us”, as Godzilla begins rampaging through Tokyo.

Cast
 Takehiro Murata as Yuji Shinoda
 Naomi Nishida as Yuki Ichinose
 Hiroshi Abe as Mitsuo Katagiri
 Shirō Sano as Shiro Miyasaka
 Mayu Suzuki as Io Shinoda
 Tsutomu Kitagawa as Godzilla
 Makoto Ito as Orga

Tristar English dub cast
 François Chau as Yuji Shinoda
 Denise Iketani as Yuki Ichinose
 Jack Ong as Shiro Miyasaka
 Ron Yuan as Mitsuo Katagiri
 Rachel Crane as Io Shinoda

Dubbing staff
Dubbing Director: Mike Schlesinger
Dubbing Studio: TriStar Pictures/Sony Pictures Entertainment

Production
Due to high demand from fans to revive the Toho Godzilla, development began on a new Toho production two months after the release of TriStar's Godzilla. Executive producer Shogo Tomiyama hired Hiroshi Kashiwabara (writer of Godzilla vs. SpaceGodzilla) and Wataru Mimura (writer of Godzilla vs. Mechagodzilla II) to write the script, stating, "If we wanted to make a new kind of Godzilla, we needed several different views. That's why I chose both Mr Kashiwabara and Mr Mimura. One producer, two screenwriters, three viewpoints." Kashiwabara felt that they had to go back to Godzilla's roots and reexamine what made him unique.

Regarding Godzilla's design, director Takao Okawara wanted to make "something new" and noted that Godzilla's height has changed over the years, stating, "I felt that that distance between human beings and Godzilla was too much, so we reduced its height back to something closer to the original at approximately 170 feet." The basic design of the suit was modelled heavily after the KingGoji suit from 1962's King Kong vs. Godzilla.

Godzilla 2000 was produced on a budget of approximately $8,300,000. Kenji Suzuki, who had worked as an assistant director on previous Godzilla movies, supervised the special effects. Miniature effects work was not emphasized as strongly as it had been in preceding installments. Instead, compositing techniques such as chroma key were heavily utilized to integrate the suitmation Godzilla footage into shots of real-life locations. The film also contains the first fully computer-generated shot of Godzilla realized in a Japanese production (previous films only used CGI to visualize graphical display representations of Godzilla or to blend computer effects work with a live-action shot).

English versions
There were two English dubbed versions of this film. As is standard practice for Toho, the film was originally dubbed in Hong Kong for use in Toho's international version. For Sony's theatrical release, the film was entirely re-dubbed by Asian-American voice actors (ADR director Mike Schlesinger deliberately made this choice because he did not want the characters to sound like they were "from Wisconsin."). Only one line from the international version ("As long as the beer's cold, who cares?") was used in the re-dubbed North American version. Several Indian versions use the English pictorial elements of the international version, however.

Sony's TriStar Pictures licensed Godzilla 2000 for theatrical distribution in North America. Sony spent approximately $300,000 to acquire the film, around $1 million to re-edit and dub the movie in English, and under  $10 million on prints and advertising. For doing so, Tristar hoped that the film would gross no worse than $12–15 million in North American theaters.

Alterations
The English dubbed version of the film runs 99 minutes - 8 minutes shorter in comparison to the 107-minute Japanese version. Most of these were minor edits done to hasten the pacing, and the sound design of the movie was completely re-worked, which included replacing the monster Orga's roar (which recycled Cretaceous King Ghidorah's from Rebirth of Mothra III) with a more menacing one and supplementing Godzilla's roars and growls with those from the 1998 film. J. Peter Robinson composed some new music meant to supplement Takayuki Hattori's music. The dubbing has a somewhat humorous, tongue-in-cheek tone to it, apparently in homage to Godzilla dubs of the 60s and 70s, with lines such as "Great Caesar's Ghost!", "Bite me!" and "I guarantee it'll [Full Metal Missiles] go through Godzilla like crap through a goose!". Dialogue was also reworked in places to change or jettison certain expository details. Some fans have criticized the English dubbed version of Godzilla 2000 for camping up what they perceive as a "serious" movie; however, Toho and Takao Okawara approved all the changes to the film in advance, and various amusing sequences throughout the story (such as people comically surviving Godzilla's rampage early in the film) establish a light-hearted tone and make it evident that it was not meant to be taken seriously. In an interview in Video Watchdog #71, Schlesinger noted that people in real life tend to speak humorously; he also felt that giving audiences some intentionally funny dialogue would make them less inclined to laugh at the monster scenes, which were supposed to be taken seriously. Originally, the film ended with the words "The End?" in cartoonish lettering, but Mike Schlesinger and Toho rejected that. "The End?" was removed from home video and television releases, though it was retained for the Spanish-subtitled VHS of the film.

Release

Box office
It opened in Japan on December 11, 1999, and grossed  (roughly $15 million) during its box office run, with approximately 2 million admissions. Tristar Pictures released Godzilla 2000 in 2,111 North American theaters on August 18, 2000.  Tristar hoped that the film would gross no worse than $12–15 million in North American theaters, but the film eventually only grossed $10 million in North American theaters.

Critical reception
The North American release of Godzilla 2000 was met with mixed critical response. The review aggregator Rotten Tomatoes reported that 57% of critics have given the film a positive review based on 69 reviews, with an average rating of 5.68/10. The site's critics consensus reads, "Godzilla 2000 is cheesy, laughable, and good entertaining fun." On Metacritic, the film has a weighted average score of 41 out of 100 based on 23 critics, indicating "mixed or average reviews". Audiences polled by CinemaScore gave the film an average grade of "B−" on an A+ to F scale.

Bruce Westbrook of the Houston Chronicle said the film "taps into a now-rare and innocent sense of wonder," and that "its action scenes are well-conceived," summarizing it as "a lovably amusing foray into vapid plotting, bad dubbing and men in rubber suits trashing miniature sets." Owen Gleiberman of Entertainment Weekly gave the film a "B" grade, saying that Godzilla 2000 "lands on an imaginative fault line somewhere between tackiness and awe." Jay Carr of The Boston Globe called Godzilla 2000 "a ton of fun, and then some." Lou Lumenick of the New York Post said "it's great to have the big guy back."
James Berardinelli of ReelViews said the film "uses the Godzilla formula effectively" and "represents solid, campy, escapist entertainment." Maitland McDonagh of TV Guide praised the film, saying that "fans won't want to miss this addition to the canon."

Susan Wloszczyna of USA Today said Godzilla 2000 "may be dull, but the familiarity of it all makes it feel ceremonial, a reassuring ritual." David Edelstein of Slate said that he "periodically tranced out," but added that "it's fun to see" and "it still manages to dispel some of the lingering stink of Roland Emmerich's 1998 remake." Stephen Holden of The New York Times wasn't impressed, saying that "only a die-hard fan of the long-running Japanese Godzilla series could love Godzilla 2000." Similarly, Stephen Hunter of The Washington Post remarked, "Godzilla, go home."

Among kaiju-related websites, Stomp Tokyo said "there are some pretty impressive special effects," and concluded that "Godzilla 2000 delivers fairly well, if not spectacularly." Toho Kingdom criticized the Japanese version, saying "it’s not hard to see why Godzilla 2000 was poorly received in Japan," but added that "the US version ... is infinitely better than its poorly paced Japanese counterpart. In all, the US version made numerous badly needed cuts from the film to tighten it up."

Accolades

Home media
In North America, Godzilla 2000 was released on DVD on December 26, 2000, and on Blu-ray on September 9, 2014. The North American Blu-ray includes both the Japanese and American cuts of the film.

Unproduced sequel

In an interview with SciFiJapan.com, Michael Schlesinger stated that he had written a script for a direct sequel to Godzilla 2000 entitled Godzilla Reborn that was to be directed by Joe Dante. The film would have shared the same tongue-in-cheek tone as the American release of Godzilla 2000, with special effects crafted by Toho. The plot would have involved Godzilla appearing in Hawaii to battle a new foe named "Miba", which was envisioned as a flying lava monster resembling a bat. Toho approved Schlensinger's script, but he was unable to secure funding for the project and the film was never made.

References

Sources

External links

1999 films
1999 science fiction films
1990s Japanese-language films
Films about extraterrestrial life
Films directed by Takao Okawara
Films set in 2000
Films set in Tokyo
Films set in Nemuro
Films set in Ibaraki Prefecture
Films set in the Pacific Ocean
Giant monster films
Godzilla films
Kaiju films
Japan Self-Defense Forces in fiction
Japanese science fiction films
Japanese sequel films
1990s monster movies
Reboot films
TriStar Pictures films
Toho films
Films with screenplays by Wataru Mimura
Films scored by Takayuki Hattori
1990s Japanese films